This is a list of notable people buried at the Forest Lawn Memorial Park cemetery in Glendale, California. The cemetery was founded in 1906 and has been used for many funerals of film stars and other celebrities since then.
 
(Those in non-public areas are marked NP.)

A

 John Aasen (1890–1938), silent movie giant
 Forrest J Ackerman (1916–2008), science fiction, horror, pop culture historian and writer and editor of Famous Monsters of Filmland magazine
 Art Acord (1890–1931), actor
 Anita Louise Adler (1915–1970), actress, wife of producer Buddy Adler
 Maurice "Buddy" Adler (1909–1960), producer, husband of actress Anita Louise
 Donald Addrisi (1938–1984), singer, one-half of the Addrisi Brothers singing-songwriting duo
 John G. Adolfi (1888–1933), director, actor and screenwriter of Warner Bros films
 Caroline Leonetti Ahmanson (1918–2005), businesswoman, philanthropist, wife of Howard F. Ahmanson, Sr.
 Howard F. Ahmanson Sr. (1906–1968), financier, philanthropist
 Leonora Ainsworth (1871-1939), screenwriter in silent era
 Wally Albright (1925–1999), child actor, Wally in the Our Gang short subjects
 Robert Alda (1914–1986), actor and singer, father of actors Alan and Antony Alda
 Richard Alexander (1902–1989), actor
 Ross Alexander (1907–1937), actor
 Duane Allen (1937–2003), NFL player
 Gracie Allen (1895–1964), actress and comedian, wife of George Burns
 Fred Lind Alles (1851–1945), businessman and civic leader, secretary for the National Irrigation Congress
 Elvia Allman (1904–1992), actress and voice actress
 Wayne Allwine (1947–2009), voice actor, sound effects editor, Foley artist, 3rd voice of Mickey Mouse
 Astrid Allwyn (1905–1978), actress
 June Allyson (1917–2006), actress
 Louis "Two Gun" Alterie (1886–1935), gangster (unmarked grave)
 Lona Andre (1915–1992), actress
 NP Laverne Andrews (1911–1967), singer
 NP Maxene Andrews (1916–1995), singer
 Lucien Andriot (1892–1979), cinematographer
 George Aratani (1917–2013), businessman and philanthropist
 George Archainbaud (1890–1959), director, producer
 NP James Arness (1923–2011), actor
 Isaac Colton Ash (1861–1933), Los Angeles City Council member 1925–27
 Roscoe Ates (1895–1962), actor and comedian
 Gene Austin (1900–1972), singer
 Marion Aye (1903–1951), silent film actress
 Mitchell Ayres (1909–1969), musician

B

 Fay Babcock (1895–1970), set decorator
 NP Lauren Bacall (1924–2014), Actress
 Constantin Bakaleinikoff (1896–1966), composer/conductor, younger brother of Mischa Bakaleinikoff
 Mischa Bakaleinikoff (1890–1960), composer/conductor, older brother of Constantin Bakaleinikoff
 Art Baker (1898–1966), actor
 Suzan Ball (1934–1955), actress
 Travis Banton (1894–1958), costume designer
 NP Theda Bara (1885–1955), actress
Marie Louise Bottineau Baldwin (Metis/Turtle Mountain Chippewa), lawyer, civil servant and suffragist.
 NP Joe Barbera (1911–2006), animator and co-founder/namesake of Hanna-Barbera
 Joan Barclay (1914–2002), actress
 Ben Bard (1893–1974), actor, husband of actress Ruth Roland (unmarked grave)
 Binnie Barnes (1903–1998), actress, wife of M.J. Frankovich
 George Barris (1925–2015), designer and builder of various Hollywood custom cars
 Jack Barry (1918–1984), television host and producer
 Billy Barty (1924–2000), actor
 Florence Bates (1888–1954), actress
 Norman F. Bates (1839–1915), Medal of Honor recipient
 Frank Joslyn Baum (1883–1958), film producer, son of L. Frank and Maud Gage Baum
 Harry Neal Baum (1889–1967), author, son of L. Frank and Maud Gage Baum
 L. Frank Baum (1856–1919), author of The Wonderful Wizard of Oz
 Maud Gage Baum (1861–1953), widow of L. Frank Baum
 Warner Baxter (1889–1951), actor
 Harry Beaumont (1888–1966), director, actor, screenwriter
 John C. Becher (1915–1986), actor
 Robert "Iceberg Slim" Beck (1918–1992), pimp turned best-selling author
 Claud Beelman (1883–1963), architect
 Wallace Beery (1885–1949), actor
 Alphonzo E. Bell Jr. (1914–2004), U.S. Representative from California
 Rex Bell (1903–1962), actor and Nevada lieutenant governor, husband of actress Clara Bow
 Madge Bellamy (1899–1990), actress
 Cosmo Kyrle Bellew (1883–1948), actor
 Elsie Lincoln Benedict (1885–1970), author and lecturer  
 Henry S. Benedict (1878–1930), U.S. Representative from California
 William Benedict (1917–1999), actor
 Enid Bennett (1893–1969), actress, wife of Fred Niblo and Sidney Franklin
 Marjorie Bennett (1896–1982), actress
 Harry Beresford (1863–1944), actor
 George Bergstrom (1876–1955), architect
 Felix Bernard (1897–1944), songwriter
 Curtis Bernhardt (1899–1981), director
 Joe Besser (1907–1988), actor and comedian (The Three Stooges)
 Claude Binyon (1905–1978), screenwriter and director
 Billie Bird (1908–2002), actress
 Julie Bishop (1914–2001), actress
 J. Stuart Blackton (1875–1941), founder of Vitagraph Studios
 Olive Blakeney (1899–1959), actress
 Clara Blandick (1876–1962), actress
 Jack Bliss (1882–1968), MLB player
 Michael Blodgett (1939–2007), actor and screenwriter
 Joan Blondell (1906–1979), actress
 Eric Blore (1887–1959), actor
 Monte Blue (1887–1963), actor
 Betty Blythe (1893–1972), actress
 Eddie Bockman (1920–2011), baseball player, manager, scout
 True Boardman (1882–1918), actor
 Virginia True Boardman (1889–1971), actress
 NP Humphrey Bogart (1899–1957), actor
 Mary Boland (1882–1965), actress
 Olive Borden (1906–1947), actress
 Gutzon Borglum (1865–1941), sculptor of Mount Rushmore
 Frank Borzage (1894–1962), actor, director
 Stephen Boss (1982-2023), actor and television personality                                                                                                                                                                          
 NP Hobart Bosworth (1867–1943), actor, director, producer, and screenwriter
 Clara Bow (1905–1965), actress
 NP William Boyd (1895–1972), actor, known for playing cowboy hero Hopalong Cassidy
 NP Charles Brabin (1882–1957), British-born director and screenwriter, husband of actress Theda Bara
 Robert N. Bradbury (1886–1949), director and screenwriter, father of Bob Steele
 NP Grace Bradley (1913–2010), actress, widow of actor William Boyd
 Lenny Breau (1941–1984), musician (unmarked grave)
 Edmund Breese (1871–1936), actor
 Tom Breneman (1902–1948), radio personality, host of Breakfast in Hollywood
 Mozelle Britton (1912–1953), actress
 John Bromfield (1922–2005), actor
 Betty Bronson (1906–1971), actress
 Rand Brooks (1918–2003), actor
 Clarence Brown (1890–1987), director (unmarked grave)
 James Harvey Brown (1906–1995), Los Angeles City Council member and municipal court judge
 Joe E. Brown (1891–1973), actor and comedian
 NP Johnny Mack Brown (1904–1974), actor and athlete
 Lansing Brown Jr. (1900–1962), photographer 
 Robert Brubaker (1916–2010), character actor
 Winifred Bryson (1892–1987), actress, widow of actor Warner Baxter
 Harold S. Bucquet (1891–1946), director
 Ralph Budd (1879–1962), railroad president
 Vincent Bugliosi (1934–2015), lawyer and author of true crime books
 Jon Bunch (1970–2016), rock singer-songwriter, frontman of Sense Field and Further Seems Forever
 Milo Burcham (1903–1944), test pilot
 Helen Burgess (1916–1937), actress
 W.R. Burnett (1899–1982), novelist and screenwriter
 Dorsey Burnette (1932–1979), singer and songwriter
 Johnny Burnette (1934–1964), singer and songwriter, younger brother of Dorsey Burnette
 Bob Burns (1890–1956), actor and comedian
 George Burns (1896–1996), actor and comedian, husband of Gracie Allen
 Francis X. Bushman (1883–1966), actor
 David Butler (1894–1979), director
 Wally Byam (1896–1962), founder of Airstream, one of the pioneer manufacturers of the travel trailer
 Ralph Byrd (1909–1952), actor

C

 Christy Cabanne (1888–1950), director
 Charles Wakefield Cadman (1881–1946), composer 
 Alice Calhoun (1900–1966), actress
 Ransom M. Callicott (1895–1962), restaurateur and politician
 Albert Ralph Campbell (1875–1925), Marine Corps Medal of Honor recipient
 NP Judy Canova (1913–1983), actress, singer, and comedian
 Eduardo Cansino Sr. (1895–1968), dancer, father of actress, Rita Hayworth
 June Caprice-Millarde (1895–1936), actress
 Ora Carew (1893–1955), actress
 Sue Carol (1906–1982), actress and talent agent, wife of Alan Ladd, step-mother of Alan Ladd, Jr., mother of David Ladd
 Jeanne Carpenter (1916–1994), child actress of silent films
 Nat Carr (1886–1944), actor
 Dona Lee Carrier (1940–1961), figure skating champion
 Earl Carroll (1893–1948), theatre impresario, owner of the Earl Carroll Theatres in New York and Hollywood
 NP Jack Carson (1910–1963), Canadian-born actor, younger brother of actor, Robert Carson
 NP Robert Carson (1909–1979), actor, older brother of actor, Jack Carson
 Emma Carus (1879–1927), singer
 William Castle (1914–1977), film director
 Connie Cezon (1925–2004), actress
 Dolly Cepeda (1964–1977), victim of the Hillside Strangler (original grave site, moved to Forest Lawn in Cypress)
 Mario Chamlee (1892–1966), opera singer
 George Chandler (1898–1985), actor, Uncle Petrie Martin on TV's Lassie
 NP Lon Chaney (1883–1930), actor (unmarked grave)
 Charles Chapman (1853–1944), founder of Chapman University
 Spencer Charters (1875–1943), actor
 Charley Chase (1893–1940), actor and comedian
 Rex Cherryman (1896–1928), actor
 Noble "Kid" Chissell (1905–1987), boxer, actor, dance marathon champion
 Tim Choate (1954–2004), actor
 Berton Churchill (1876–1940), actor
 Frank Churchill (1901–1942), composer for Walt Disney Productions' cartoons
 George Cisar (1912–1978), actor
 Kit Clardy (1892–1961), US Representative from Michigan
 Buddy Clark (1912–1949), singer
 Carroll Clark (1894–1968), art director
 Edward Clark (1878–1954), actor, songwriter
 Jack Clark (1925–1988), actor
 Betty Ross Clarke (1892–1970), actress
 Stiles O. Clements (1883–1966), architect
 Brian Clewer (1928–2008), radio host 
 Elmer Clifton (1890–1949), actor and director
 Clifford E. Clinton (1900–1969), businessman, founder and owner of Clifton's Cafeteria
 John Clum (1851–1932), Indian agent, founder of The Tombstone Epitaph newspaper and first mayor of Tombstone, AZ
 Andy Clyde (1892–1967), actor
 Joe Cobb (1916–2002), child actor in Hal Roach's Our Gang comedic film series
 Octavus Roy Cohen (1891–1959), author
 Maria Cole (1922–2012), singer, widow of Nat King Cole
 Nat King Cole (1919–1965), singer
 Natalie Cole (1950–2015), singer-songwriter, daughter of Nat King and Maria Cole
 Buddy Collette (1921–2010), musician (unmarked grave)
 William Collier Sr. (1864–1944), actor, filmmaker
 Russ Columbo (1908–1934), singer
 Roger Converse (1911–1994), actor
 Jack Conway (1887–1952), director, actor
 NP Sam Cooke (1931–1964), singer
 Lillian Copeland (1904–1964), athlete
 Philip Coppens (1971–2012), author
 NP Ellen Corby (1911–1999), actress
 Regis Cordic (1926–1999), actor
 Herbert Corthell (1878–1947), actor
 Don Costello (1901–1945), actor
 Edward Coxen (1880–1954), actor
 Charles H. Crawford (1879–1931), crime figure, mobster, leader of the City Hall Gang in Los Angeles
 Kathryn Crawford (1908–1980), actress
 Laird Cregar (1913–1944), actor
 Donald Crisp (1882–1974), actor and director
 George E. Cryer (1875–1961), 32nd Mayor of Los Angeles
 NP George Cukor (1899–1983), director (unmarked grave)
 Zara Cully (1892–1978), actress
 Robert Cummings (1910–1990), actor
 Lester Cuneo (1888–1925), silent film western actor
 Edward S. Curtis (1868–1952), writer/Old American west photographer/ethnologist
 Michael Curtiz (1886–1962), director

D

 Fifi D'Orsay (1904–1983), actress and singer
 Babe Dahlgren (1912–1996), Major League Baseball player
 Dan Dailey (1915–1978), actor, singer and dancer
 Dorothy Dandridge (1922–1965), actress and singer
 Ruby Dandridge (1900–1987), actress, mother of Dorothy Dandridge
 Mickey Daniels (1914–1970), actor, one of the original children in the Our Gang short subjects
 William H. Daniels (1900–1970), cinematographer, Garbo's cameraman
 Jane Darwell (1879–1967), actress
 Dorothy Davenport (1895–1977), actress, screenwriter, film director and producer
 Ed J. Davenport (1899–1953), Los Angeles City Council member
 Delmer Daves (1904–1977), director, screenwriter, and producer
 NP Altovise Davis (1943–2009), actress and dancer, wife of Sammy Davis, Jr.
 George Davis (1914–1998), art director
 Jim Davis (1909–1981), actor, Jock Ewing on TV's Dallas
 Mildred Davis (1901–1969), actress, wife of comic actor, Harold Lloyd, mother of Harold Lloyd Jr.
 NP Sammy Davis Jr. (1925–1990), actor, singer and dancer
 NP Sammy Davis Sr. (1900–1988), dancer, father of Sammy Davis, Jr.
 Jack Dawn (1892–1961), make-up artist (unmarked grave)
 Sam De Grasse (1875–1953), actor
 Julia Dean (1878–1952), actress
 Carter DeHaven (1886–1977), actor
 Flora Parker DeHaven (1883–1950), actress, wife of Carter DeHaven
 Osborn Deignan (1873–1913), Medal of Honor recipient
 Eddie DeLange (1904–1949), musician (unmarked grave)
 Georges Delerue (1925–1992), composer
 Cyril Delevanti (1889–1975), actor
 Armando del Moral (1916–2009), film journalist, helped found the Golden Globes
 Hampton Del Ruth (1875–1958), actor, director, producer, screenwriter
 Joseph De Stefani (1879–1940), actor
 Buddy DeSylva (1895–1950), songwriter, co-founder of Capitol Records
 William Demarest (1892–1983), character actor, Uncle Charley on My Three Sons
 Carol Dempster (1901–1991), actress
 Noah Dietrich (1889–1982), businessman
 Fannie Charles Dillon (1881–1947), composer, pianist
 Alan Dinehart (1889–1944), actor
 Elias Disney (1859–1941), father of Walt Disney, and Flora Disney (1903-1935), mother of Walt Disney and Roy O. Disney.
 Lillian Disney (1899–1997), ink artist, philanthropist, widow of Walt Disney, mother of Diane Disney Miller
 Walt Disney (1901–1966), film studio and entertainment park founder, co-creator of Mickey Mouse, Donald Duck, and Goofy, as well as the 1st voice of Mickey Mouse.
 Richard Dix (1893–1949), actor
 George Dolenz (1908–1963), actor, star of The Count of Monte Cristo, father of The Monkees' Micky Dolenz, grandfather of Ami Dolenz
 Jenny Dolly (1892–1941), entertainer, twin sister of Rosie Dolly
 Rosie Dolly (1892–1970), entertainer, twin sister of Jenny Dolly
 Don Douglas (1905–1945), actor
 Gordon Douglas (1907–1993), child actor turned director
 Lloyd C. Douglas (1877–1951), novelist
 Billie Dove (1903–1997), actress
 William C. Dowlan (1882-1947), actor and director
 Maxine Doyle (1915–1973), actress
 Theodore Dreiser (1871–1945), novelist
 Chuck Dressen (1894–1966), MLB baseball player, coach and manager
 Louise Dresser (1878–1965), actress
 NP Marie Dressler (1868–1934), Canadian-born actress and comedian
 NP Don Drysdale (1936–1993), MLB baseball player for the Los Angeles Dodgers (ashes later scattered in 2003)
 David Dukes (1945–2000), actor
 Rosetta Duncan (1894–1959), entertainer
 Vivian Duncan (1897–1986), entertainer
 Scott R. Dunlap (1892–1970), director, producer, screenwriter, actor
 Glenn S. Dumke (1917–1989), educator, chancellor of California State University system (1962–1982)
 Minta Durfee (1889–1975), actress
 Marion Howard Dunham (1842–1921), teacher, activist, suffragist
 Junior Durkin (1915–1935), actor

E

 Hubert Eaton (1881–1966), founder and managing director of Forest Lawn cemeteries
 Jay Eaton (1899–1970), character actor
 Mary Eaton (1901–1948), actress
 Neely Edwards (1883–1965), actor and comedian (unmarked grave)
 Ralph Edwards (1913–2005), television and radio host
 Arnold Ehret (1866–1922), health educator and author of diet books
 Sally Eilers (1908–1978), actress
 Charles Irving Elliott (1892–1972), aviation pioneer
 Dick Elliott (1886–1961), character actor
 Connie Emerald (1892–1959), English stage actress, mother of Ida Lupino
 Fern Emmett (1896–1946), actress, wife of Henry Roquemore
 Francis de Erdely (1904–1959), painter
 Julian Eltinge (1881–1941), actor and female impersonator
 Ray Enright (1896–1965), director
 Leon Errol (1881–1951), actor and comedian
 Estelle Etterre (1899–1996), actress
 William E. Evans (1877–1959), U.S. Congressman
 Jason Evers (1922–2005), actor

F

 Douglas Fairbanks (1883–1939), actor (relocated to Hollywood Forever Cemetery in 1941)
 Dot Farley (1881-1971), actress
 Joseph W. Farnham (1884-1931), screenwriter and film editor
 William Farnum (1876-1953), actor
 Patricia Farr (1913–1948), actress
 Oda Faulconer (1884-1943), lawyer and judge and president of the Bank of Italy, San Fernando, and West Adams State Bank, Los Angeles
 Don Fedderson (1913–1994), TV writer, producer, creator of the sitcoms, My Three Sons and Family Affair
 Al Ferguson (1888–1971), actor
 Helen Ferguson (1901–1977), actress
 Romaine Fielding (1867–1927), actor and director
 NP W. C. Fields (1880–1946), actor and comedian
 Larry Fine (1902–1975), actor, comedian and musician (The Three Stooges)
 Margarita Fischer (1886–1975), actress
 Robert Fiske (1889–1944), actor
 George Fitzmaurice (1885–1940), director
 Johnny Flamingo (1934–2000), blues singer
 Frank P. Flint (1862–1929), politician
 Errol Flynn (1909–1959), actor
 Tony Fontane (1925–1974), singer
 Charles E. Ford (1899–1942), director, producer
 Harrison Ford (1884–1957), silent film actor
 Helen Ford (1894–1982), actress
 John Anson Ford (1883–1983), Los Angeles County supervisor, namesake of John Anson Ford Amphitheatre
 Thomas Francis Ford (1873–1958), U.S. Congressman and Los Angeles City Council member
 Lewis R. Foster (1898–1974), director, producer, screenwriter and composer
 Ivor Francis (1918–1986), actor
 Betty Francisco (1900–1950), actress
 Bruno Frank (1887–1945), novelist and screenwriter
 Chester Franklin (1889–1954), actor, director, older brother of director-producer, 
 M. J. Frankovich (1909–1992), producer and athlete, adopted son of Joe E. Brown
 Nell Franse (1889–1973), actress
 Robert Frazer (1891–1944), actor
 John D. Fredericks (1869–1945), U.S. Congressman
 Charles K. French (1860–1952), actor
 George B. French (1883–1961), actor
 Rudolf Friml (1879–1972), composer
 Dwight Frye (1899–1943), actor
 Charles E. Fuller (1887–1968), evangelist
 Jules Furthman (1888-1966), screenwriter

G

 NP Clark Gable (1901–1960), actor
 Jacqueline Gadsden (1900–1986), actress
 Danny Gans (1956–2009), singer, actor, comedian, impressionist
 Allen Garfield (1939–2020), actor
 Martin Garralaga (1894–1981), actor
 Bud Geary (1898–1946), actor
 Herb Geller (1928–2013), saxophonist
 Rose A. George (1946–2010), First Lady of Rivers State
 George Getty (1855–1930), businessman and lawyer
 Andy Gibb (1958–1988), singer, songwriter, and actor
 Jerry Giesler (1886–1962), criminal defense lawyer
 John Gilbert (1899–1936), actor
 Sandra Giles (1932–2016), actress
 A. Arnold Gillespie (1899–1978), special effects artist
 King C. Gillette (1855–1932), businessman, founder of Gillette shaving company
 Tom Gilson (1934–1962), actor
 NP Hermione Gingold (1897–1987), actress
 J. Frank Glendon (1886–1937), actor
 Peter Godfrey (1899–1970), actor and director
 Renee Godfrey (1919–1964), actress and singer, wife of Peter Godfrey
 NP Frances Goldwyn (1903–1976), actress, wife of Samuel Goldwyn (unmarked grave)
 NP Samuel Goldwyn (1879–1974), producer and mogul (unmarked grave)
 Edgar J. Goodspeed (1871–1962), theologian
 Huntley Gordon (1887–1956), actor
 NP Jetta Goudal (1891–1985), actress
 Edmund Goulding (1891–1959), director and writer
 Joe Grant (1908–2005), animator and writer
 Charles Grapewin (1869–1956), actor
 NP Sid Grauman (1879–1950), theater impresario, founder of the Million Dollar Theater, Egyptian Theatre and Grauman's Chinese Theatre
 Gary Gray (1936–2006), actor
 Alfred E. Green (1889–1960), director
 Burton E. Green (1868–1965), oilman, real-estate developer, co-founder of Beverly Hills, California.
 Harrison Greene (1884–1945), actor
 NP Sydney Greenstreet (1879–1954), English actor
 NP Harold Grieve (1901–1993),  art director, husband of Jetta Goudal
 Bessie Griffin (1922–1989), singer
 Edward H. Griffith (1888–1975), director, producer and screenwriter
 Raymond Griffith (1895–1957), actor and comedian
 Robert E. Gross (1897–1961), CEO and Chairman of the Lockheed Corporation
 Paul A. Guilfoyle (1902–1961), actor
 Fred L. Guiol (1898–1964), director and screenwriter

H

 Frank Hagney (1884–1973), actor
 Alan Hale Sr. (1892–1950), actor
 Charlie Hall (1899–1959), actor
 Ernest Haller (1896–1970),  cinematographer
 Kay Hammond (1901–1982), actress
 Lula Mae Hardaway (1930–2006), songwriter, mother of musician, Stevie Wonder
 Russell Harlan (1903–1974), cinematographer
 NP Jean Harlow (1911–1937), actress
 Rex Harrison (1908–1990), actor (ashes scattered on wife Lilli Palmer's grave)
 Elizabeth Harrower (1918–2003), actress and screenwriter
 Charles Hatfield (1875–1958), scientist
 Harry Hayden (1882–1955), actor
 Edith Head (1897–1981), costume designer
 NP Charlotte Hennessy (1873–1928), Canadian actress, mother of actors, Mary, Lottie and Jack Pickford
 Ralph Hepburn (1896–1948), race car driver
 Holmes Herbert (1882–1956), actor
 Babe Herman (1903–1987), baseball player
 Jean Hersholt (1886–1956), actor and humanitarian
 Louis Jean Heydt (1903–1960), actor
 Ruth Hiatt (1906–1994), actress
 Winston Hibler (1910–1976), Disney narrator, screenwriter, producer, director
 Alfred Hickman (1873–1931), English actor, husband of Nance O'Neil
 Walter Hiers (1893–1933), actor
 NP Thelma Hill (1906–1938), actress and comedian
 Józef Hofmann (1876–1957), concert pianist and inventor
 Fay Holden (1893–1973), actress
 Charles A. Holland (1872–1940), Los Angeles City Council member 1929–31
 Alice Hollister (1886–1973), actress
 George Hollister (1873–1952), cinematographer
 Burton Holmes (1870–1958), director and producer, pioneered travel films
 Helen Holmes (1892–1950), actress
 Bob Holt (1928–1985), voice actor
 Gloria Hope (1901–1976), actress, wife of Lloyd Hughes
 NP Ian Hornak (1944–2002), artist
 James W. Horne (1881–1942), actor and director
 Victoria Horne (1911–2003), actress, widow of Jack Oakie
 Edward Everett Horton (1886–1970), character actor, voice actor
 William K. Howard (1899–1954), director
 Adele C. Howells (1886–1951), leader in the Church of Jesus Christ of Latter-day Saints
 Jobyna Howland (1897–1958), actress
 Lloyd Hughes (1897–1958), actor, husband of Gloria Hope
 Rupert Hughes (1872–1956), filmmaker
 Cyril Hume (1900–1966), screenwriter
Maud Humphrey (1868–1940), suffragette, commercial illustrator, mother of Humphrey Bogart
 Marlin Hurt (1905–1948), actor and comedian
 June Hutton (1919–1973), actress and singer
 Martha Hyer (1924–2014), actress, widow of Hal B. Wallis

I

 Wiard Ihnen (1897–1979), art director and production designer, husband of costume designer, Edith Head
 Rex Ingram (1892–1950), Irish director
 George Irving (1874–1961), actor

J

 NP Joe Jackson (1928–2018), talent manager, Jackson family patriarch, father of Michael Jackson

 NP Michael Jackson (1958–2009), entertainer, singer, songwriter, record producer, dancer
 Carrie Jacobs-Bond (1862–1946), singer and songwriter, known for songs like A Perfect Day, I Love You Truly and Just Awearyin' for You
 Elsie Janis (1889–1956), actress
 Joseph Barbera (1911-2006)
 DeWitt Jennings (1871–1937), actor
 Adela Rogers St. Johns (1894–1988), journalist, screenwriter, novelist
 Emory Johnson (1894–1960), director, actor
 Arthur Johnston (1898–1954), composer
 Caro Jones (1923–2009), casting director
 F. Richard Jones (1893–1930), director, producer, husband of costume designer, Irene Lentz
 Isham Jones (1894–1956), bandleader, songwriter
 George Johnson (1898–1961), voice actor, voice of Goofy (1939–1943)
 NP Jennifer Jones (1919–2009), actress, wife of actor, Robert Walker, producer, David O. Selznick and industrialist, Norton Simon
 Rupert Julian (1879–1943), director
 Ray June (1895–1958), cinematographer
 Helmi Juvonen (1903–1985), artist plus

K

 Gus Kahn (1886–1941), songwriter
 Bert Kalmar (1884–1947), songwriter
 Terry Kath (1946–1978), musician, guitarist, baritone-voiced singer-songwriter of Chicago
 Kelly Keen (1978-1981), only known fatality of a coyote attack in the United States
 Tom Keene (1896–1963), actor
 William Keighley (1889–1984), director
 Roy Kellino (1912–1956), child actor turned cinematographer-director, husband of actress/writer Pamela Mason
 John L. Kennedy (1854–1946), politician, Congressman of Nebraska's 2nd district
 A. Atwater Kent (1873–1949), businessman, radio manufacturer, invented the ignition coil 
 Erle C. Kenton (1896–1980), actor and director
 Doris Kenyon (1897–1979), actress
 Hal C. Kern (1894–1985), film editor
 Harry Kerr (1890–1957), songwriter, lyricist
 J. Warren Kerrigan (1879–1947), actor and director
 Charles Henry King (1853–1930), paternal grandfather of President Gerald Ford
 Leslie Lynch King Sr. (1884–1941), biological father of President Ford
 Dorothy Kirsten (1910–1992), operatic soprano singer
 Ted Knight (1923–1986), actor
 Clarence Kolb (1874–1964), actor
 Henry Kolker (1874 [or 1870]-1947), actor and director
 NP Red Kress (1905–1962), baseball player
 NP Kathryn Kuhlman (1907–1976), evangelist
 Edward A. Kull (1885–1946), cinematographer and director
 Robert Kurrle (1890–1932), cinematographer

L

 Louis L'Amour (1908–1988), novelist
 Alan Ladd (1913–1964), actor, father of Alan Ladd, Jr. and David Ladd
 David Landau (1879–1935), actor
 Carole Landis (1919–1948), actress
 Rosemary Lane (1913–1974), actress
 Lash LaRue (1917–1996), B movie western actor, known for his bullwhip
 Ivan Lebedeff (1894–1953), actor
 Gretchen Lederer (1891–1955), actress
 Otto Lederer (1886–1965), actor
 Rowland V. Lee (1891–1975), motion picture director
 Mervyn LeRoy (1900–1987), director and producer
 Hal LeSueur (1901/1903-1963), actor, brother of Joan Crawford
 Fritz Leiber, Sr. (1882–1949), actor
 Irene Lentz (1900–1962), costume designer, wife of F. Richard Jones
 Robert Z. Leonard (1889–1968), director
 Elgin Lessley (1883–1944), cinematographer
 Gus Levene (1911–1979), composer
 David Lewis (1903–1987), producer, partner of James Whale
 Mitchell Lewis (1880–1956), actor
 Ann Little (1891–1984), actress
 Lucien Littlefield (1895–1960), actor
 Robert Livingston (1904–1988), actor
 Doris Lloyd (1896–1968), actress
 Frank Lloyd (1886–1960), actor, director, producer, writer
 Harold Lloyd (1893–1971), actor and comedian
 Harold Lloyd Jr. (1931–1971), actor, singer, son of Harold Lloyd and Mildred Davis
 Jeanette Loff (1906–1942), actress and singer
 Arthur Loft (1897–1947), actor
 NP Carole Lombard (1908–1942), actress, wife of William Powell and Clark Gable
 Tom London (1889–1963), actor
 Theodore Lorch (1873–1947), actor
 Ernst Lubitsch (1892–1947), director
 Ida Lupino (1918–1995), actress and director
 Hamilton Luske (1903–1968), animator and director
 Eustace Lycett (1914–2006), Disney visual/special effects artist

M

 Jeanette MacDonald (1903–1965), actress and singer
 Jimmy MacDonald (1906–1991), Disney voice over artist, musician, head of Disney sound effects department, 2nd voice of Mickey Mouse
 Kenneth MacKenna (1899–1962), actor and director
 Mary MacLaren (1896–1985), actress
 Douglas MacLean (1890–1967), actor, producer, and writer
 Rouben Mamoulian (1897–1987), director
 Edwin L. Marin (1899–1951), director
 Oliver T. Marsh (1893–1941), MGM cinematographer, brother of actress, Marguerite Marsh and Mae Marsh, father of saxophonist, Warne Marsh
 Warne Marsh (1927–1987), tenor saxophonist, son of MGM cinematographer, Oliver T. Marsh
 Alan Marshal (1909–1961), actor
 Chico Marx (1887–1961), actor and comedian
 Gummo Marx (1893–1977), agent
 LeRoy Mason (1903–1947), actor
 NP Will Mastin (1878–1979), dancer and singer, leader of the Will Mastin Trio
 NP Daya Mata (1914–2010), religious leader
 Doris May (1902–1984), actress (unmarked grave)
 Erskine Mayer (1889–1957), baseball player
 Mike Mazurki (1907–1990), actor and wrestler
 Chuck McCann (1934–2018), voice actor
 Marian McCargo (1932–2004), actress
 Meade McClanahan (1894?–1959), Los Angeles City Council member
 Gladys McConnell (1905–1979), actress
 Ted McCord (1900–1976), cinematographer
 Johnston McCulley (1883–1958), author and writer, creator of Zorro
 Robert H. "Red" McDaniel, U.S. National Champion Thoroughbred trainer six straight years (1950-1955)
 Marc McDermott (1881–1929), actor
 Marie McDonald (1923–1965), actress and model
 Frank McGlynn Sr. (1866–1951), actor
 J.P. McGowan (1880–1952), director
 Frank McGrath (1903–1967), actor, Charlie Wooster on TV's Wagon Train
 Malcolm McGregor (1892–1945), actor
 Burr McIntosh (1862–1942), photographer, publisher, actor
 Wanda McKay (1915–1996), actress
 Robert McKimson (1910–1977), animator and director
 Thomas McKimson (1907–1998), animator and comic book artist, older brother of Robert McKimson
 James McLachlan (1852–1940), US Representative of California
 NP Victor McLaglen (1886–1959), actor
 Jimmy McLarnin (1907–2004), Boxing champion
 Gloria Hatrick McLean (1918–1994), model, animal rights activist and wife of actor, Jimmy Stewart
 Norman Z. McLeod (1898–1964), director
 Joseph T. McNarney (1893–1972), US Army General
 Aimee Semple McPherson (1890–1944), evangelist
 Rolf McPherson (1913–2009), denominational leader, clergy, son of Aimee Semple McPherson
 Syd Mead (1933–2019), conceptual artist and futurist
 Henrietta Mears (1890–1963), Christian educator
 George Meehan (1891–1947), cinematographer
 Blanche Mehaffey (1908–1968), actress and dancer
 Dimitre Mehandjiysky (1915–1999), artist
 William C. Mellor (1903–1963), cinematographer
 William Cameron Menzies (1896–1957), art director
 Beryl Mercer (1882–1939), actress
 Iris Meredith (1915–1980), actress
 Bess Meredyth (1890–1969), screenwriter, wife of directors, Wilfred Lucas and Michael Curtiz, mother of writer, John Meredyth Lucas
 Ron W. Miller (1933–2019), businessman, football player, son-in-law of Walt Disney 
 Robert Andrews Millikan (1868–1953), physicist and Nobel Prize winner
 Vincente Minnelli (1903–1986), director
 Tom Mix (1880–1940), actor
 Polly Moran (1883–1952), actress and comedian
 Rushton Moreve (1948–1981), bassist of Steppenwolf
 Antonio Moreno (1887–1967), actor and director
 Clayton Moore (1914–1999), actor, The Lone Ranger
 Del Moore (1916–1970), comedian, actor and radio announcer
 Ernest Carroll Moore (1871–1955), educator, co-founder of University of California, Los Angeles
 Harvey Seeley Mudd (1888–1955), engineer and educator
 William Mulholland (1855–1935), engineer, engineered the Los Angeles Aqueduct, Mulholland Dam, St. Francis Dam, Panama Canal consultant, and other dams, namesake of Mulholland Drive
 Ralph Murphy (1895–1967), film director
 Spud Murphy (1908–2005), composer
 Zon Murray (1910-1979), actor

N
  
 Charles W. Nash (1864–1948), automobile manufacturer, co-founder of Nash Motors
 Alla Nazimova (1879–1945), actress, founder and owner of Garden of Allah Hotel
 Frank Nelson (1911–1986), character actor/voice actor known for his "EEE-Yeeeeeeeeesssss?" catchphrase and appearances on I Love Lucy, The Jack Benny Program, and Sanford and Son
 Skylar Neil (1991-1995), daughter of Vince Neil
 NP Alfred Newman (1900–1970), composer, patriarch of Newman family of composers
 Emil Newman (1911–1984), music director, conductor, composer, younger brother of Alfred Newman, member of Newman musical family
 Fred Niblo (1874–1948), director
 Gertrude Niesen (1911–1975), actress and singer
 William Nigh (1881–1955), actor, director, and writer
 Marian Nixon (1904–1983), actress
 L. L. Nunn (1853–1925), educator
 Ervin Nyiregyházi (1903–1987), pianist

O

 Hugh O'Brian (1925–2016), actor
 Eugene O'Brien (1880–1966), actor
 Virginia O'Brien (1919–2001), actress and singer
 Cathy O'Donnell (1923–1970), actress, wife of producer Robert Wyler, sister-in-law of director William Wyler
 Nance O'Neil (1874–1965), actress
 Jack Oakie (1903–1978), actor and comedian
 Merle Oberon (1911–1979), actress
 Clifford Odets (1906–1963), playwright
 Charles Ogle (1865–1940), actor
 Edna May Oliver (1883–1942), actress
 Gertrude Olmstead (1897–1975), actress, wife of director Robert Z. Leonard
 Culbert Olson (1876–1962), California Governor
 Maria Ouspenskaya (1876–1949), actress
 Richard F. Outcault (1863–1928), cartoonist, inventor of the Comic strip, creator of Buster Brown and The Yellow Kid
 NP Tudor Owen (1898–1979), character actor
 Monroe Owsley (1900–1937), actor
 Dennis O'Keefe, (1908-1968), actor

P

 Doris Packer (1904–1979), actress
 Ernest Palmer (1885–1978), cinematographer
 Lilli Palmer (1914–1986), actress
 Franklin Pangborn (1889–1958), actor
 NP Alexander Pantages (1867–1936), theater impresario, founder of Pantages Theatres
 James Parrott (1897–1939), actor, comedian, and director, younger brother of Charley Chase
 Marion Parker (1915–1927), murder victim
 John B. Parkinson (1861–1935), architect
 Allen E. Paulson (1922–2000), aviation entrepreneur
 Claude Payton (1882–1955), actor
 Lucy Payton (1877–1969), actress
 Joe Penner (1904–1941), actor and comedian
 Susan Peters (1921–1952), actress
 Mary Philips (1901–1975), actress, wife of Humphrey Bogart and Kenneth MacKenna
 Clyde Phillips (1891-1946), Thoroughbred racehorse trainer
 Ben Piazza (1933–1991), actor
 NP Jack Pickford (1896–1933), actor
 NP Lottie Pickford (1893–1936), actress
 NP Mary Pickford (1892–1979), actress, businesswoman, co-founder of United Artists
 Jack Pierce (1889–1968), makeup artist
 Robert Pierce (1914–1978), humanitarian and social reformer
 Michael Piller (1948–2005), screenwriter
 Lon Poff (1870–1952), actor
 NP Dick Powell (1904–1963), actor and singer
 John Robert Powers (1892–1977), model agency owner
 Steve Priest (1948–2020), musician
 Merrill Pye (1902–1975), art director
 Yogananda Paramahansa (1893 - 1952), Indian Yogi and Spiritual master

Q

 Fred Quimby (1886–1965), producer of MGM and Hanna-Barbera animated cartoons
 John Qualen (1899–1987), actor

R

 Paul Rader (1878–1938), evangelist
 John S. Ragin (1929–2013), actor
 Ralph Rainger (1901–1942), songwriter
 Addison Randall (1906–1945), actor
 Albertina Rasch (1891–1967), dancer, wife of Dimitri Tiomkin
 Charles Ray (1891–1943), actor, director, producer, screenwriter (unmarked grave)
 Gene Raymond (1908–1998), actor, husband of Jeanette MacDonald
 Jack Raymond (1886–1953), actor and director
 Dorothea Holt Redmond (1910–2009), art director and set designer, wife of Harry Redmond, Jr.
 Harry Redmond Jr. (1909–2011), special effects artist and producer
 Phillip Reed (1908–1996), actor
 Vivian Reed (1894–1989), silent film actress, wife of Alfred E. Green
 Wallace Reid (1891–1923), actor
 Frederick Emil Resche (1866–1946), U.S. Army brigadier general
 Craig Reynolds (1907–1949), actor
 Gene Reynolds (1923–2020), actor and television producer
 Lucille Ricksen (1910–1925), child actress
 Cleo Ridgely (1894–1962), actress
 Fritzi Ridgeway (1896–1961), actress
 Adele Ritchie (1874–1930), singer
 Joan Rivers (1933-2014), comedian, actress, producer, writer 
 Naya Rivera (1987-2020), Singer, Actress                                                                                                                                                     
 Lyda Roberti (1906–1938), actress
 Beverly Roberts (1914–2009), actress
 Blossom Rock (1895–1978), actress, older sister of Jeanette MacDonald
 Will Rogers (1879–1935), actor, humorist, newspaper columnist (moved to The Will Rogers Memorial in Claremore, OK in 1946)
 Jim Rohn (1930–2009), American entrepreneur
 Ruth Roland (1892–1937), actress and producer
 Gladys Root (1905–1982), criminal defense attorney
 Henry Roquemore (1886–1943), actor
 Alan Roscoe (1886–1933), actor
 Bodil Rosing (1877–1941), Danish actress, mother-in-law of Monte Blue
 J. Walter Ruben (1899–1942), director and screenwriter
NP Charlie Ruggles  (1886–1970), actor, older brother of film director/producer, Wesley Ruggles
NP Wesley Ruggles (1889–1972), film director/producer, younger brother of Charlie Ruggles
 Barbara Ruick (1930–1974), actress
 William Russell (1884–1929), actor

S

 NP S. Z. Sakall (1883–1955), actor
 Chic Sale (1885–1936), actor
 Ben L. Salomon (1914–1944), dentist, posthumous recipient of Medal of Honor
Hank Sanicola (1914–1974), songwriter
 Drake Sather (1959–2004), comedian and writer
 Jan Savitt (1907-1948) musician
 Paul Sawtell (1906–1971), Polish-born, American film score composer 
 Paul Scardon (1874–1954), actor, producer, director
 Victor Schertzinger (1888–1941), composer, director, producer, screenwriter
 Mabel Julienne Scott (1892–1976), actress
 Ynez Seabury (1907–1973), actress
 Don Sebastian (1911–1987), wrestler
 Sybil Seely (1902–1984), actress
 William A. Seiter (1890–1964), director
 NP Lesley Selander (1900–1979), director
 William Edwin Self (1921–2010), actor and producer
 NP David O. Selznick (1902–1965), motion picture producer, founder of Selznick International Pictures
 NP Lewis J. Selznick (1869–1933), producer and motion picture industry pioneer
 NP Myron Selznick (1898–1944), motion picture producer and talent agent
 NP Fred Sersen (1890–1962), painter and special effects artist
 Helen Shaw (1897–1997), character actress
 Ethel Shannon (1898–1951), actress
 Kim Shattuck (1963–2019), singer
 Athole Shearer (1900–1985), actress, sister of Norma Shearer
 NP Norma Shearer (1902–1983), actress, wife of Irving Thalberg 
 Del Shofner (1934–2020), football player
 Lowell Sherman (1885–1934), director and actor
 Clarence A. Shoop (1907–1968), Air Force General
 Leo Shuken (1906–1976), composer
 Louis Silvers (1889–1954), film composer
 S. Sylvan Simon (1910–1951), director
 Russell Simpson (1880–1959), actor
 NP Red Skelton (1913–1997), actor and comedian
 Edward Sloman (1886–1972), actor, director and screenwriter
 Tod Sloan (1874–1933), thoroughbred racing jockey, innovated low-crouch riding position over a horse's neck
 H. Allen Smith (1909–1998), politician, Congressman
 Harold Smith, (1909–1958), Olympic diver
 Rainbeaux Smith (1955–2002), actress
 R. Thomas Smith (1878–1957), thoroughbred horse trainer
 NP William French Smith (1917–1990), U.S. Attorney General
 Roland N. Smoot (1901-1984), U.S. Vice admiral
 Carrie Snodgress (1945–2004), actress
 Marguerite Snow (1889–1958), actress
 Carl Spitz (1894–1976), animal trainer
 Leo Spitz (1888–1956), film executive
NP Bunker Spreckels (1949–1977), surfboard designer
 Hanley Stafford (1899–1968), actor
 John M. Stahl (1886–1950), director and producer
 NP Lionel Stander (1908–1994), actor
 Jules C. Stein (1896–1981), physician, co-founder of MCA Inc. and the Jules Stein Eye Institute
 NP Max Steiner (1888–1971), composer
 Casey Stengel (1890–1975), Major League Baseball manager
 James Stephenson (1889–1941), actor
 Anita Stewart (1895–1961), actress
 James Stewart (1908–1997), actor, retired Air Force Major General
 Gloria Hatrick McLean Stewart (1918–1994), actress and wife of James Stewart
 Ruth Stonehouse (1892–1941), actress and director
 Axel Stordahl (1913–1963), composer and arranger
 Herbert Stothart (1885–1949), composer
 Archie Stout (1886–1973), cinematographer
 Joseph Strauss (1870–1938), architect, engineer of the Golden Gate Bridge
 Elbridge Amos Stuart (1856–1944), industrialist, Carnation Milk Company founder and president
 Jan Styka (1858–1925), painter

T

 Al Taliaferro (1905–1969), Disney cartoonist 
 Frank Tashlin (1913–1972), animator, director, screenwriter
 Art Tatum (1909–1956), musician (relocated from Angelus-Rosedale Cemetery in 1991)

 Elizabeth Taylor (1932–2011), actress, activist
  Russi Taylor (1944–2019), voice actress
 NP Robert Taylor (1911–1969), actor
 NP Irving Thalberg (1899–1936), producer
 NP Ursula Thiess (1924–2010), actress, wife of Robert Taylor
 Jefferson Thomas (1942–2010), civil rights icon, member of the Little Rock Nine
 Fred Thomson (1890–1928), actor
 Edward L. Thrasher (1892–1971), Los Angeles City Council member
 Chief Thundercloud (1899–1955), actor
 Lawrence Tibbett (1896–1960), actor and opera singer
 Dimitri Tiomkin (1894–1979), composer
 Genevieve Tobin (1899–1995), actress, wife of William Keighley
 Sammee Tong (1901–1964), actor
 Ernest Torrence (1878–1933), actor
 Raquel Torres (1908–1987), actress
 Louise Tracy (1896–1983), founder of the John Tracy Clinic for deaf children
 Spencer Tracy (1900–1967), actor
 Henry Travers (1874–1965), actor
 Emerson Treacy (1900–1967), actor
 Lamar Trotti (1900–1952), reporter, screenwriter, producer, 20th Century Fox executive
 Jim Tully (1886–1947), writer
 Charlie Tuna (1944–2016), radio personality
 Ben Turpin (1869–1940), actor and comedian
 Lurene Tuttle (1907–1986), actress, mother of Barbara Ruick

V

 Valda Valkyrien (1895–1956), ballerina
 NP Vang Pao (1929–2011), CIA and Royal Laotian Army General of Hmong descent
 W. S. Van Dyke (1889–1943), director
 Adamae Vaughn (1905–1943), actress
 Bobby Vernon (1897–1939), actor
 Alfred Victor Verville (1890–1970), aviation pioneer
 Theodore von Eltz (1893–1964), actor
 Rufus B. von KleinSmid (1875–1964), president of University of Arizona and University of Southern California
 Gustav von Seyffertitz (1862–1943), actor

W

 George Waggner (1894–1984), actor, director and producer
 Sir William James Wanless (1865-1933), surgeon
 Jerry Wald (1911-1962), producer and screenwriter
 Charles Waldron (1874-1946), actor
 H. M. Walker (1878-1937), screenwriter
 Nella Walker (1886–1971), actress
 Beryl Wallace (1912–1948), singer, girlfriend of theatre producer, Earl Carroll
 Hal B. Wallis (1898–1986),  producer
 Bill Walsh (1913–1975), Disney producer and screenwriter
 Clara Ward (1924–1973), singer
 Jay Ward (1920–1989), producer and writer of various animated series
 Ethel Waters (1896–1977), actress and singer
 NP Johnny "Guitar" Watson (1935–1996), musician
 Roy Webb (1888–1982), composer (unmarked grave)
 Alice Stebbins Wells (1873–1957), first American born female police officer, LAPD officer
 Mary Wells (1943–1992), singer
 Roland West (1885–1952), director
 Gordon Westcott (1903–1935), actor
 George Westmore (1879–1931), make-up artist and hairdresser, patriarch of the Westmore family
 Monte Westmore (1902–1940), make-up artist
 Perc Westmore (1904–1970), make-up artist
 Wally Westmore (1906–1973), make-up artist
 Jack Westrope (1918–1958), Hall of Fame jockey
 Carl Jules Weyl (1890–1948), art director
 James Whale (1889–1957), director
 Richard A. Whiting (1891–1938), composer of popular songs
 Gayne Whitman (1890–1958), actor
 Ted Wilde (1889–1929), director and screenwriter
 Clara Williams (1888–1928), actress
 Earle Williams (1880–1927), actor
 Kay Williams (1916–1983), actress and model, fifth wife of Clark Gable
 Robert Williams (1894–1931), actor
 Dorothy Wilson (1909–1998), actress
 Lois Wilson (1894–1988), actress
 Rex Wimpy (1899–1972), special-effects artist, cinematographer
 Claire Windsor (1892–1972), actress
 Grant Withers (1905–1959), actor
 Gloria Wood (1923–1995), singer and voice actress
 Sam Wood (1883–1949), director, producer, writer, actor
 Stacy Woodard (1902–1942), nature filmmaker
 Ali-Ollie Woodson (1951–2010), musician and member of The Temptations
 Bobby Womack (1944–2014), soul singer
Harry Womack (1945–1974), soul singer, member of The Valentinos, younger brother of Bobby Womack, older brother of Cecil Womack
 George Woolf (1910–1946), Hall of Fame jockey, rider of Seabiscuit
 John Elgin Woolf (1908–1980), architect
 Robert Woolsey (1888–1938), actor and comedian
 Hank Worden (1901–1992), character actor
 Wallace Worsley (1878–1944), stage actor turned silent film director
NP Philip K. Wrigley (1894–1977), chewing gum manufacturer, MLB executive, founder of the AAGPBL, son of William Wrigley Jr.
 NP William Wrigley Jr. (1861–1932), chewing gum magnate, owner of the Chicago Cubs
 Robert Wyler (1900–1971), producer, older brother of William Wyler, husband of Cathy O'Donnell
 William Wyler (1902–1981), director and producer
 Patrice Wymore (1926–2014), actress, widow of Errol Flynn
 NP Ed Wynn (1886–1966), actor and comedian, father of Keenan Wynn
 NP Keenan Wynn (1916–1986), character actor, son of Ed Wynn

Y

 James "J-Dilla" Yancey (1974–2006), hip-hop producer
 Barton Yarborough (1900–1951), actor
 Celeste Yarnall (1944–2018), actress
 NP Paramahansa Yogananda (1893–1952), Indian spiritual guru and author
 Robert Young (1907–1998), actor
 Joe Yule (1892–1950), actor and father of Mickey Rooney

Z 
 Lee Zahler (1893–1947), composer, music director

References

External links
 Tribute to the founder of Forest Lawn Memorial-Parks by Charles Elias Disney

 
Forest Lawn Memorial Park
Forest Lawn Memorial Park
Interments